Catalina is a brand of women’s swimwear. It was once one of the oldest clothing manufacturers in California. Their history began in 1907, as Bentz Knitting Mills, a small manufacturer of underwear and sweaters. The name was changed to Pacific Knitting Mills in 1912, accompanied by the introduction of swimwear to their existing knit lines. The name was changed again finally to Catalina in 1928.

Catalina founded the Miss USA and Miss Universe pageants as a promotion.

In the 1920s, Catalina produced increasingly daring swimwear, including the boldly striped "Chicken Suit", men's "Speed Suit" and "Rib Stitch 5" suits. With the rising glitz of the silver screen in the 1930s, Catalina adopted the slogan "Styled for the Stars of Hollywood". They added to the prestige by using Hollywood starlets, including Bette Davis, Joan Blondell, and Olivia de Havilland in their marketing campaigns. At the time, the average Catalina swimsuit retailed between five and ten dollars, equivalent to $–$ today (assuming 1935 dollars).

In the 1950s, Fred Cole, a silent movie actor in the 1920s, promoted Catalina swimwear with Esther Williams.

In the 1960s, Catalina became a sister company to Cole of California, a swimwear manufacturer established in 1925. The duo later joined Authentic Fitness Corporation, a subsidiary of Warnaco Inc, in 1993. The merger created a company of swim, active and fitness brands. The following year, with the rising importance of mass market retailers, the decision was made to offer Catalina to Wal-Mart stores across America.

Catalina had a presence in South America, through license agreements, especially Brazil, Argentina, Uruguay and Chile, sponsoring the beauty pageants in these countries, with several contestants winning the Miss Universe event. Today the brand is manufactured in Brazil, and distributed in the Mercosur countries by Grupo Aguia.

Catalina was part of the Warnaco Swimwear Group's portfolio of brand names including Speedo, Anne Cole, Nautica and Michael Kors. It was sold in the United States, Puerto Rico, Canada and Mexico.

Catalina is predominantly women's swimwear, including a rib suit known as the "Everybody Tank", as well as Separates, Athletic, and Maternity lines. In 2007, Catalina landed seventh on a list of top swimwear brands ranked by consumer awareness, as published in Women's Wear Dailys 4th Annual Book of Lists.

In December 2007 The Warnaco Group announced it had sold the Catalina business to In Mocean Group.

References

External links
 Official website

Clothing manufacturers
Companies based in California
Swimwear brands